Chemcedine El Araichi (born 18 May 1981) is a retired Belgian-Moroccan football player and currently the assistant manager of Royal Albert Quévy-Mons.

Coaching career
On 19 June 2019, El Araichi was appointed assistant manager of Luigi Nasca at Quévy-Mons.

Statistics

International career
El Araichi earned his first cap for Morocco during a Friendly against Czech Republic on 11 February 2009 played in Morocco and finished 0–0.

References

External links
 

1981 births
Living people
Sportspeople from Mons
Moroccan footballers
Morocco international footballers
Belgian sportspeople of Moroccan descent
Belgian footballers
Moroccan expatriate footballers
Belgian expatriate footballers
R.A.E.C. Mons players
Belgian expatriate sportspeople in Hungary
K.S.V. Roeselare players
R.E. Mouscron players
Expatriate footballers in Hungary
Győri ETO FC players
Moroccan expatriate sportspeople in Hungary
R.F.C. Seraing (1922) players
Belgian Pro League players
Challenger Pro League players
Association football defenders
Francs Borains players
Footballers from Hainaut (province)